The 1980 Eastern 8 men's basketball tournament was held in Pittsburgh, Pennsylvania, at the Civic Arena from February 26, 1980, to March 1, 1980 (first round games at campus sites). Villanova defeated West Virginia 74-62 to win their second tournament championship. Lowes Moore of West Virginia was named the Most Outstanding Player of the tournament.

Bracket

External links
  Atlantic 10 Men's Basketball Tournament History 

Atlantic 10 men's basketball tournament
Tournament
Eastern 8 men's basketball tournament
Eastern 8 men's basketball tournament
Eastern 8 men's basketball tournament